Brian O’Hara (born 1979) is an American law enforcement official who is serving as the 54th Chief of the Minneapolis Police Department. He was the first police chief appointed to lead the Minneapolis Police Department after the murder of George Floyd.

Early life and education 
Born in Belleville, New Jersey, O’Hara was raised in Kearny, New Jersey as one of two siblings. His father died while he was a child, and he was raised by his mother.  He attended Kearny High School and graduated in 1997.  He lived in Newark, New Jersey for twelve years, and earned his undergraduate and graduate degrees in criminal justice from Rutgers University–Newark.   While at Rutgers, he received the Richard J. Hughes Award for having achieved the highest academic standing. He holds a graduate certificate in criminal justice education from the University of Virginia. 

O’Hara completed the Harvard Kennedy School’s program for Senior Executives in State and Local Government. He is a graduate of the 240th Session of the FBI National Academy and of the 54th Session of the Senior Management Institute for Police at Boston University, O’Hara was also a certified public manager and police academy instructor.

Law enforcement career

Newark Police Division 
O’Hara was sworn in as a Newark police officer in 2001 and began as a patrol officer in the city’s West District, serving in the Vailsburg Task Force and Safe City Task Force. As a sergeant, he worked as a field supervisor in the North District and the Office of Policy and Planning.  As a lieutenant, he was the North District Executive Officer and served as a special assistant to the Police Director.  He commanded the Metro Division and Traffic Unit.
 
In 2017, O’Hara was promoted to captain and appointed to oversee the implementation of a federal consent decree mandating the City of Newark reform its policies and training around police use of force, civilian oversight, supervision, internal affairs, and procedures for stops, searches, and arrests.  He was known to lead town hall meetings to obtain community input for reforming police policies, and he was credited by the independent federal monitor for the “unprecedented progress with policy development, drafting new policies required by the Consent Decree, and proposing revisions to some of its current policies to meet Consent Decree standards.”

Peter Harvey, who served as the first African-American Attorney General of New Jersey, attributed the success of Newark's compliance with a federal consent decree to reform the Newark Police Department to O'Hara. He acknowledged that some supervisors retired as they struggled to keep up with the pace of change. Furthermore, Harvey recognized O'Hara's efforts in implementing policies that went beyond the requirements of the agreement, which resulted in significant progress in the police force's reform in Newark. Thus, O'Hara played a crucial role in bringing about positive change in Newark's police department.

From 2020 until being appointed Public Safety Director, O’Hara served as deputy chief and Commander of the Accountability, Engagement, and Oversight Bureau of the Newark Police Division. This Bureau comprises the Office of Professional Standards (Internal Affairs), Consent Decree and Planning Division, Training Division, Firearms Range, Community & Clergy Affairs Unit, Technology Unit, Compliance Unit, All Force Investigation & Tracking Team (AFIT), Risk Management Unit, Advocate Unit, and the Candidate Investigations Unit.

Newark Public Safety Director 
By February 16, 2021, when Newark Mayor Ras Baraka tapped O’Hara to serve as Newark’s Public Safety Director, O’Hara was already well known in community and law enforcement circles as someone who had spent years working on police reform and building community trust.  In this role, O’Hara was the chief executive officer of the Division of Police, Division of Fire, Office of Emergency Management and Homeland Security, and the city’s 9-1-1 emergency communications center. O’Hara managed a $244 million budget and had oversight of more than 2,000 employees; including 1,000 sworn police officers, 650 firefighters, and 350 civilian employees.    
 
During his tenure as Newark Public Safety Director, O’Hara was credited with leading police reform efforts, enhancing collaborative partnerships, and reducing the amount of gun violence in Newark. O’Hara was known as a reform-minded police executive who was up to the task of implementing change and building trust in the community. Additionally, O’Hara was known among the community and activists in Newark as someone who could deliver on the promise of changing police culture while reducing serious crime.

Minneapolis Police Department 
On September 29, 2022, O'Hara was nominated by Minneapolis Mayor Jacob Frey to succeed Chief Medaria Arradondo as the 54th Chief of the Minneapolis Police Department.  O’Hara was the first police chief to be appointed in Minneapolis after the murder of George Floyd.  O’Hara was selected by Mayor Frey after a search committee referred three candidates for consideration after a national search. After touring the city and meeting with stakeholders and community organizations, O’Hara’s nomination was unanimously confirmed by the Minneapolis City Council on November 3, 2022.   
 
The first outsider appointed to lead the department in 16 years, O’Hara was sworn in as the 54th Chief of the Minneapolis Police Department at a private ceremony in Minneapolis City Hall on November 8, 2022, before being welcomed at a multi-cultural community event hosted by Bishop Howell at Shiloh Temple International Ministries in North Minneapolis.

Policing style 
O’Hara believes policing requires collaboration, and has been a key proponent of police reform, a well as enhancing collaborative approaches between law enforcement agencies as well as community-based organizations. O’Hara has been credited for enhancing relationships with federal, state, and local law enforcement agencies, as well building and supporting approaches that give community a voice in policing and public safety; while reducing the amount of gun violence and serious crime.

Personal life 
O'Hara has been married twice, and his current wife, Wafiyyah O'Hara, holds the rank of lieutenant in the Newark Police Department, where she is the highest-ranking Black and Muslim woman in the department. He has two sons from the prior marriage. O’Hara currently resides in Minneapolis, Minnesota. Additionally, O’Hara is a Roman Catholic.

See also 

 Newark Police Department
 List of Minneapolis Chiefs of Police
 Police abolition movement in Minneapolis

References 

Living people
1979 births
Chiefs of the Minneapolis Police Department
Kearny High School (New Jersey) alumni
People from Belleville, New Jersey
People from Kearny, New Jersey
People from Newark, New Jersey
Rutgers University–Newark alumni